Killarney is a suburb of Bulawayo, Zimbabwe. It is named after the town of Killarney in Co. Kerry in southwest Ireland. It is a low density suburb found on the North Eastern part of Bulawayo. In Killarney, there is a primary school, Centenary Primary school and The Zimbabwe School Of Mines, which is the best mining school in Southern Africa. On the outskirts of Killarney there is Old Nic Mine.

References 

Suburbs of Bulawayo